The 2015–16 UMass Lowell River Hawks men's basketball team represented the University of Massachusetts Lowell during the 2015–16 NCAA Division I men's basketball season. They were coached by third year head coach Pat Duquette and played most of their home games at Costello Athletic Center, with five home games at the Tsongas Center. They were a member of the America East Conference.

UMass Lowell was in the third year of a transition to Division I and thus ineligible for the postseason, including the America East tournament.

They finished the season 11–18, 7–9 in America East play to finish in fifth place.

Previous season
The River Hawks finished the season 12–17, 6–10 in America East play to finish in sixth place.

Departures

2015 incoming recruits

2016 incoming recruits

Roster

Schedule

|-
!colspan=9 style="background:#CC3333; color:#333399;"| Non-conference regular season

|-
!colspan=9 style="background:#CC3333; color:#333399;"| America East regular Season

References

UMass Lowell River Hawks men's basketball seasons
UMass Lowell
UMass Lowell River Hawks men's basketball
UMass Lowell River Hawks men's basketball